The Dubois String Quartet was a Canadian string quartet that actively performed for 28 consecutive seasons from 1910 to 1938. The ensemble was founded and led by cellist Jean-Baptiste Dubois who was the only member of the group to play in every season. The other original members were violinists Albert Chamberland and Alphonse Dansereau and violist Eugene Schneider. Later members included violinists Eugène Chartier, René Gagnier, and Lucien Martin. Later members included violist Joseph Mastrocola and violinists Eugène Chartier, René Gagnier, Lucien Martin, Maurice Onderet, and Lucien Sicotte. The quartet was disbanded upon Dubois' death in July 1938.

References

Canadian string quartets
Musical groups from Montreal
Musical groups established in 1910
Musical groups disestablished in 1938